Hollywood Ending is a 2002 American comedy film written and directed by Woody Allen, who also plays the principal character. It tells the story of a once-famous film director who suffers hysterical blindness due to the intense pressure of directing.

Plot
Val Waxman is a once-prestigious film director who now directs television commercials. When he is thrown off his latest effort (a deodorant commercial filmed in the frozen north of Canada), he desperately seeks a real movie project.

Out of the blue, Val receives an offer to direct a big-budget blockbuster to be set in New York City. However, the offer comes from his former wife, Ellie, and her boyfriend, Hal, the studio head who stole her from Val years ago.

Pushed by his agent Al Hack, Val reluctantly agrees to the project, but a psychosomatic ailment strikes him blind just before production is to begin. With Al's encouragement and aid, Val keeps his blindness a secret from the cast and crew (and Hal). During filming, Val rekindles his relationship with Ellie and reconnects with his estranged son, Tony, while his much younger girlfriend, Lori, leaves him. When Val regains what had been missing his life, he regains his sight as well, and realizes that the movie he directed while blind is a disaster.

Sure enough, the movie flops - but is a hit in France, where he is invited to direct a film. After winning Ellie back, he happily proclaims, "Thank God the French exist."

Cast

Production notes

Haskell Wexler was the original cinematographer, but was fired by Woody Allen after a week of filming as they couldn't agree on how to film certain shots. Wedigo von Schultzendorff replaced Wexler.

Soundtrack

Going Hollywood (1933) - Music by Nacio Herb Brown - Lyrics by Arthur Freed - Performed by Bing Crosby
It's Been So Long (1935) - Music by Walter Donaldson - Lyrics by Harold Adamson - Performed by Edmond Hall
Hooray for Hollywood (1937) - Music by Richard A. Whiting - Lyrics by Johnny Mercer - Performed by Dick Powell, Frances Langford, Johnnie Davis, Gene Krupa & Benny Goodman
Descarga (1955) - Written by Chico O'Farrill - Performed by Tito Puente
Sweet And Lovely (1931) - Written by Gus Arnheim, Neil Moret & Harry Tobias - Performed by Barbara Carroll
Too Close For Comfort (1956) - Written by Jerry Bock, Lawrence Holofcener & George David Weiss - Performed by Jackie Gleason
Poor Butterfly (1916) - Written by Raymond Hubbell & John Golden - Performed by Bobby Hackett & His Orchestra
Serenade in Blue (1942) - Music by Harry Warren - Lyrics by Mack Gordon - Performed by Jackie Gleason
No Moon at All (1947) - Written by David Mann & Redd Evans - Performed by Barbara Carroll
Grindhouse (1989) - Written by Ivan De Prume, Sean Yseult, Jay Yuenger & Rob Zombie - Performed by White Zombie

Box office
Ticket sales in the United States reach just under $5 million and a worldwide gross of $14.8 million.

It was screened out of competition at the 2002 Cannes Film Festival. In the United Kingdom, it was the first of Allen's films not to receive a theatrical release.

Critical reception
The film received mixed reviews from critics. The review aggregator Rotten Tomatoes reported that the film received 46% positive reviews, based on 134 reviews, with an average rating of 5.42/10. The website's critics consensus states: "Although Hollywood Ending contains some zany one-liners, its promising premise is far from developed." Metacritic reported the film had an average score of 46 out of 100, based on 37 reviews. Audiences polled by CinemaScore gave the film an average grade of "B−" on an A+ to F scale.

Film critic Bryant Frazer thought that it suffered from poor editing. He wrote, "What's most frustrating is the sense that Hollywood Ending could have been quite a bit better than it actually is. At 114 minutes, it's decisively lacking in the brevity that used to characterize Allen's pictures—even the super-serious, Bergman-inspired stuff. Worse, his timing seems to be off—the filmmaker who was once notorious for cutting his films to the absolute bone now gives us rambling, overlong shots featuring performers who almost seem to be ad libbing their dialogue. I ran to the Internet Movie Database to investigate, and discovered what may be the problem—Susan Morse is gone. Morse, the editor who had worked with Allen since Manhattan in 1979 and who turned into a real soldier by the time of the jazzy montage that characterized Deconstructing Harry, was reportedly a victim of budget-cutting within the ranks."

In 2016, film critics Robbie Collin and Tim Robey ranked Hollywood Ending as the worst movie by Woody Allen.

References

External links
 

2000s screwball comedy films
2002 films
American screwball comedy films
DreamWorks Pictures films
Films scored by David Arnold
Films about film directors and producers
Films about filmmaking
Films directed by Woody Allen
Films set in New York City
Films shot in New York City
Films with screenplays by Woody Allen
The Kennedy/Marshall Company films
2002 comedy films
2000s English-language films
2000s American films
Films about disability